The 2015 African Volleyball Championship U21 was held in Cairo, Egypt from 27 February to 1 March 2015. The champions of the tournament qualified for the 2015 FIVB Volleyball Men's U21 World Championship.

Egypt finished the 3-team round-robin tournament on top of the standing to clinch their third title.

Qualification
3 CAVB under-21 national teams have registered to participate in the 2015 African Championship U21.

 (Hosts)

Squads

Venue
 Eastern Company Hall, Cairo, Egypt

Round robin
All times are Eastern European Time (UTC+02:00).

|}

|}

Final standing

Awards

Most Valuable Player
 Ahmed Diaa
Best Spiker
 Hamza Ouafi
Best Blocker
 Abdelrahman Abdalla
Best Server
 Mohamed Ali Elsheikh

Best Setter
 Ahmed El Ashry
Best Receiver
 Larbi Hedroug
Best Libero
 Ibrahim Sbaibi

References

External links
Official website

African Volleyball Championship U21
Volleyball Championship U21
2015 in Egyptian sport
International volleyball competitions hosted by Egypt
February 2015 sports events in Africa
March 2015 sports events in Africa